This is a list of all roster changes that occurred prior to the 2019–20 season.

Player movement and other transactions

Team changes

Unannounced signings
The following players have appeared either in a match or on the bench for an I-League club without being announced as signed.

Released players
This list includes players who were released from their club and who have yet to sign with another I-League club or who have left the league.

References

2019–20 I-League